The Glendive City Water Filtration Plant, in Glendive, Montana, was built in 1917 after years of delays, after the city was founded in 1902.  Water was delivered in barrels to residences in Glendive until it was completed.  It was listed on the National Register of Historic Places in 1988.

Burns & McConnell Engineering designed the brick  plant and Norwood Engineering of Florence, Massachusetts constructed it.  A two-story addition was made in 1923.

It was listed on the National Register as part of a study of multiple historic resources in Glendive which also listed several others.

See also
Monroe Avenue Water Filtration Plant, NRHP-listed in Grand Rapids, Michigan

References

National Register of Historic Places in Dawson County, Montana
Infrastructure completed in 1917
1917 establishments in Montana
Water supply infrastructure on the National Register of Historic Places
Water treatment facilities
Water in Montana